is a 2015 Japanese comedy film directed by Sabu. It was screened in the main competition section of the 65th Berlin International Film Festival.

Cast
 Ken'ichi Matsuyama as Chasuke
 Ito Ohno as Yuri
 Ren Ôsugi as Taneda
 Yūsuke Iseya as Hikomura
 Hiromasa Taguchi
 Tina Tamashiro as Chako
 Susumu Terajima as Kuroki

References

External links
 

2015 films
2015 comedy films
Japanese comedy films
2010s Japanese-language films
Films directed by Sabu
Films set in Okinawa Prefecture
2010s Japanese films